Jaroszowice  is a village in the administrative district of Gmina Wadowice, within Wadowice County, Lesser Poland Voivodeship in southern Poland. It has a population of 1,700.

References

Villages in Wadowice County